Reinholz is a German surname. Notable people with the surname include:

 Art Reinholz (1903–1980), American baseball player
 Randy Reinholz (born 1961), Native American director, playwright, and professo

See also
 Reinhold

German-language surnames
Surnames of German origin